Cinzia Cavazzuti (born 12 September 1973) is an Italian former judoka who competed in the 2000 Summer Olympics and in the 2004 Summer Olympics.

References

External links
 
 

1973 births
Living people
Italian female judoka
Olympic judoka of Italy
Judoka at the 2000 Summer Olympics
Judoka at the 2004 Summer Olympics
Mediterranean Games gold medalists for Italy
Mediterranean Games medalists in judo
Competitors at the 2001 Mediterranean Games
20th-century Italian women
21st-century Italian women